The B14 is a national road in Namibia, running since 2018 from Gobabis to Grootfontein. A further expansion from Gobabis to Aranos in the south is planned.

References

Roads in Namibia